Robert Stephen Wetoska (born August 22, 1937) is an American former professional football player who was an offensive tackle for ten seasons in the National Football League (NFL) for the Chicago Bears.  He played college football for the Notre Dame Fighting Irish and was selected in the fifth round of the 1959 NFL Draft by the Washington Redskins.

Personal life
Wetoska is of Polish descent.

References

External links
 Bears Top 100 Players: Bob Wetoska

1937 births
Living people
American football offensive linemen
American people of Polish descent
Chicago Bears players
Notre Dame Fighting Irish football players
Players of American football from Minneapolis